Wiang Nong Long is a district (amphoe) of Lamphun province, northern Thailand.

History
The minor district (king amphoe) was split off from Pa Sang district becoming effective on 1 April 1995.

On 15 May 2007, all 81 minor districts were upgraded to full districts. With publication in the Royal Gazette on 24 August, the upgrade became official.

Geography
Neighboring districts are (from the east clockwise) Pa Sang and Ban Hong of Lamphun Province, Chom Thong and Doi Lo of Chiang Mai province.

Administration

Central administration 
The district Wiang Nong Long is divided into three sub-districts (tambon), which are further subdivided into 25 administrative villages (Muban).

Local administration 
There are three sub-district municipalities (Thesaban Tambon) in the district:
 Wang Phang consisting of sub-district Wang Phang.
 Nong Yuang consisting of sub-district Nong Yuang.
 Nong Long consisting of sub-district Nong Long.

References

Wiang Nong Long